The 2016 Fred Page Cup was the 22nd Canadian Eastern Junior A Ice Hockey Championship for the Canadian Junior Hockey League. The Woodstock Slammers hosted it for the first time in cup history. The tournament was held May 4th to May 8th at the Carleton Civic Centre in Woodstock, New Brunswick. The Carleton Place Canadians of the CCHL, entered the tournament as the defending champions and looked to three-peat as champions. The tournament champion qualified for the 2016 Royal Bank Cup held in Lloydminster, Saskatchewan hosted by the AJHL's Lloydminster Bobcats at the Centennial Civic Centre.

Teams
Woodstock Slammers (Host)
Regular Season: 32-10-6 (2nd MHL North Division)
Playoffs: Defeated by Dieppe (4-3).
Pictou County Crushers (MHL Champion)
Regular Season: 25-18-5 (3rd MHL South Division)
Playoffs: Defeated Valley (4-2), Defeated  South Shore (4-1), Defeated Dieppe (4-2) to win league.
Carleton Place Canadians (CCHL Champion)
Regular Season: 43-16-3 (1st CCHL Robinson Division)
Playoffs: Defeated Pembroke (4-1), Defeated Brockville (4-0), Defeated Ottawa (4-3) to win league.
Longueuil Collège Français (QJHL Champion)
Regular Season: 44-8-3 (1st LHJQ Alexandre Burrows Division)
Playoffs: Defeated Valleyfield (4-0), Defeated Terrebonne (4-1), Defeated Granby (4-0) to win league.

Tournament

Round robin

Schedule and results 

All games played in Woodstock, NB.

Semifinal results

Final results

Roll of League Champions
CCHL: Carleton Place Canadians
MHL: Pictou County Crushers
QJHL: Longueuil Collège Français

References

External links
2016 Fred Page Cup Website
MHL Website
QJHL Website
CCHL Website

Fred Page Cup 2016
Fred Page Cup
Fred Page Cup 2016
Woodstock, New Brunswick
2016 in New Brunswick